Teanoba is a community near Nalerigu in the Mamprusi East Municipal District in the North East Region of Ghana.

References 

North East Region, Ghana
Communities in Ghana